"" (Swedish for 'God, who holds the children dear') is an old prayer for children, of unknown origin. In the book the prayer is called "" ('A general prayer for little children') and reads as follows:

It is likely based on an orally transmitted prayer. It was first printed as a hymn in the Salvation Army songbook of 1907.

The prayer is also sometimes sung with the same melody as "Twinkle, twinkle, little star". The first printed version of the prayer was sung to the melody "".

Sources 
 

Christian prayer